Grégory Miermont (born 16 July 1979) is a French mathematician working on probability, random trees and random maps.

Biography
After high school, Miermont trained for two years at Classe préparatoire aux grandes écoles at the end of which he was admitted at the École normale supérieure in Paris. He studied there from 1998 to 2002, spending the 2001–2002 year as a visiting student in Berkeley. He received his doctorate at Pierre and Marie Curie University in 2003, under the supervision of Jean Bertoin. Then, he became a CNRS researcher in 2004 at University of Paris-Sud and École normale supérieure, and was promoted to the rank of professor in 2009. Since 2012 he is a professor at the École normale supérieure de Lyon.

Work
Miermont has worked on the theory of probability, more precisely on the geometry and scaling limits of random planar maps, and on fragmentation related to random trees.

Awards and honors

Diplomas, titles and awards
 2003: PhD Thesis (advisor J. Bertoin)
 2008: Habilitation dissertation
 2007: Prize of the Fondation des Sciences Mathématiques de Paris
 2009: Rollo Davidson Prize
 2012: Prize of the European Mathematical Society
 2014: Doeblin Prize
 2015: Medallion lecturer: Compact Brownian Surfaces

Selected writings
 G. Miermont, Self-similar fragmentations derived from the stable tree. I. Splitting at heights, Probab. Theory Related Fields, 127 (2003), pp. 423–454 .
 B. Haas and G. Miermont, The genealogy of self-similar fragmentations with negative index as a continuum random tree, Electron. J. Probab., 9 (2004), pp. no. 4, 57–97 .
 G. Miermont, Tessellations of random maps of arbitrary genus, Ann. Scient. Ec. Norm. Supér. 42, fascicule 5, 725–781 (2009). URL
 G. Miermont, "The Brownian map is the scaling limit of uniform random plane quadrangulations". Acta Math. 210, 319–401 (2013) .

References

External links
 Grégory Miermont's website
 

1979 births
Living people
Academic staff of the École Normale Supérieure
Probability theorists
21st-century French mathematicians
École Normale Supérieure alumni
Pierre and Marie Curie University alumni
Scientists from Paris